Shashl is a Zimbabwean music artist. She is the first Zimbabwean female musician to be signed under Universal Music Africa.

Born Ashleigh Moyo, Shashl was born in Harare Zimbabwe. She is the daughter of former Zimbabwe Health minister Obadiah Moyo. She had her early education at Hellenic Secondary School in Harare.

Shashl began her career in 2017 when she released her debut track titled No More then released her first single project under Universal Music titled Blow it in the wind. She was nominated for best female Artist in the Southern African region at the 8th African Muzik Magazine Awards (AFRIMMA). She also won Best Newcomer at Zimbabwe Music Awards.

Discography

Singles

No More
Blow it in the wind
Heart 2 Heart
Going Through
Ocean Emotion
Sorry feat. Dj Tira
Getto Buddies
Milli
Dhindindi
Manyepo
In my heart

Shashl released her debut 14 track album on the 14th of March 2022 which was produced by Levels Chillspot named Highway.

References

Living people
Zimbabwean musicians
People from Harare
Year of birth missing (living people)